The Sentinel is a daily newspaper based in Carlisle, Pennsylvania, serving the Harrisburg–Carlisle metropolitan area.

In 2012, the newspaper launched a partnership with abc27 News in Harrisburg, Pennsylvania. The media outlets coordinate and share news coverage. Also that year, The Sentinel expanded its print edition to include weekly local sections about food, health, outdoors, faith, entertainment, and history; a daily local opinion page; and a daily "Capital Region" page with news from Harrisburg and its suburbs.

In 2013, the newspaper's circulation rose when the nearby Patriot-News reduced its print distribution from seven days per week to three. It opened a bureau in the state Capitol Complex in Harrisburg with Calkins Media, which provides statehouse news coverage to The Sentinel and Calkins Media's newspapers across Pennsylvania.

Its digital offerings include desktop and mobile versions of cumberlink.com and an iOS and Android app.

See also
List of newspapers in Harrisburg
List of newspapers in Pennsylvania

References

External links
cumberlink.com: The Carlisle Sentinel online

Newspapers established in 1861
Newspapers published in Harrisburg, Pennsylvania
Lee Enterprises publications
1861 establishments in Pennsylvania
Daily newspapers published in Pennsylvania